Yarra Junction was a railway station on the Warburton east of Melbourne,  Australia.  The station operated until the line closed in 1965.  The building was constructed in 1888 as the Lilydale railway station and was relocated to Yarra Junction in 1914, due to the provision of a new station at Lilydale. The building now houses the Upper Yarra Museum. 

Between 1913 and 1945, Yarra Junction was the junction station for the  gauge Powelltown Tramway.

References

External links
The station in 1964
The station entrance, 1964.

Disused railway stations in Melbourne
Railway stations in Australia opened in 1901
Railway stations closed in 1965
1965 disestablishments in Australia